The 96th Flying Training Squadron is part of the 340th Flying Training Group and is the reserve associate to the 47th Flying Training Wing based at Laughlin Air Force Base, Texas.  It operates T-1 Jayhawk, T-6 Texan II, and T-38 Talon aircraft conducting flight training.

The 96th flew combat in the European Theater of Operations and the Mediterranean Theater of Operations between 25 December 1942 and 3 May 1945.

It flew fighter escort and air defense from 1947 to 1949 and air defense from 1951 to 1957.

The squadron was redesignated as the 96th Flying Training Squadron and trained USAF pilots to fly supersonic jet aircraft from 1973 to 1993.  Since 1998 it has trained Air Force Reserve instructor pilots.

History

World War II

The squadron was first activated in early 1942 at Harding Field, Louisiana as the 96th Pursuit Squadron, one of the original three squadrons of the 82d Pursuit Group.  It soon moved to California where it equipped with Lockheed P-38 Lightnings and began training with Fourth Air Force as the 96th Fighter Squadron.  It left California in the fall and sailed for Northern Ireland, where it received additional combat training under Eighth Air Force.  A month after the initial Operation Torch landings in North Africa the squadron deployed to Algeria, where it entered combat as an element of Twelfth Air Force.

In North Africa, the squadron flew antisubmarine patrols, bomber escort missions and attacked enemy shipping and airfields, moving its base east through Algeria and Tunisia.  As the North African campaign drew to a close, the unit began attacking targets in Italy, earning a Distinguished Unit Citation for its actions on 25 April 1943 during an attack on enemy airfields in Foggia.

In September, the squadron participated in Operation Husky, the invasion of Sicily, during which it was awarded a second Distinguished Unit Citation for a bomber escort mission against marshalling yards near Naples.  The squadron moved to Italy, where it became part of Fifteenth Air Force as part of the buildup to provide fighter cover for Fifteenth's heavy bombers.  On 10 June 1944 the squadron earned a third Distinguished Unit Citation for its actions during an attack on oil refineries in Ploiești, Romania.

Following the surrender of Germany, the squadron remained in Italy until September 1945, when it was inactivated  In the course of the war the squadron destroyed 194 enemy aircraft.

Cold War
In 1947 the squadron was again activated at Grenier Field, New Hampshire, where it was equipped with North American P-51 Mustangs as a Strategic Air Command fighter escort unit.   Between April and June 1948 the squadron deployed to Ladd Air Force Base, Alaska, where it practiced rendezvousing with and escorting bombers, intercepting simulated enemy bombers and aerial gunnery.  In August 1949 it was transferred to Continental Air Command and its primary role became air defense, but this mission change was brief, for the squadron was inactivated in October.

In late 1952, the squadron, now designated the 96th Fighter-Interceptor Squadron, was activated under Air Defense Command (ADC).   and assigned to the 4710th Defense Wing.  It was stationed at New Castle Air Force Base, Delaware, where it replaced the federalized 142d Fighter-Interceptor Squadron, which was returned to the control of the Pennsylvania Air National Guard.   The 96th took over the personnel, mission, and Lockheed F-94 Starfire aircraft of the inactivating 142d.

In February 1953, another major reorganization of ADC activated Air Defense Groups at ADC bases with dispersed fighter squadrons.  Air Defense Groups were assigned to defense wings and assumed direct control of the fighter squadrons at those bases, as well as support squadrons to carry out their role as the USAF host organizations at the bases.  As a result of this reorganization, the 525th Air Defense Group activated at New Castle and the 96th was assigned to it.  In July 1953 the squadron upgraded to a newer model of the F-94, which was armed with Mighty Mouse rockets rather than cannon.

In August 1955, ADC implemented Project Arrow, which was designed to bring back on the active list the fighter units which had compiled memorable records in the two world wars.   As part of this project, the 525th Air Defense Group was replaced by the squadron's World War II headquarters, the 82d Fighter Group.   The 96th was inactivated along with its parent group in early 1958 when ADC ended its operations at New Castle.

Pilot Training
In 1972 Air Training Command replaced its Major Command (MAJCON) controlled flying training units with USAF controlled units (AFCON) units.  As part of this program the squadron was redesignated the 96th Flying Training Squadron and activated at Williams Air Force Base, Arizona when its parent 82d Flying Training Wing replaced the 3525th Pilot Training Wing.  At Williams the unit trained USAF pilots to fly Cessna T-37 Tweet jet aircraft in the basic phase of the Undergraduate Pilot Training program. The squadron was inactivated in 1993 when Williams closed in the second round of the Base Realignment and Closure program.

In 1998, the 96th Flying Training Squadron was activated in the Air Force Reserve at Laughlin Air Force Base, Texas as an associate of the 47th Flying Training Wing.  As the reserve associate unit for the wing the squadron trains Air Force Reserve pilots.

Lineage
 Constituted as the 96th Pursuit Squadron (Interceptor) on 13 January 1942
 Activated on 9 February 1942
 Redesignated 96th Pursuit Squadron (Interceptor) (Twin Engine) on 22 April 1942
 Redesignated 96th Fighter Squadron (Twin Engine) on 15 May 1942
 Redesignated 96th Fighter Squadron, Two Engine on 22 February 1944
 Inactivated on 9 September 1945
 Activated on 12 April 1947
 Redesignated 96th Fighter Squadron, Single Engine on 15 August 1947
 Inactivated on 2 October 1949
 Redesignated 96th Fighter-Interceptor Squadron 11 September 1952
 Activated on 1 November 1952
 Inactivated on 8 January 1958
 Redesignated 96th Flying Training Squadron on 22 June 1972
 Activated 1 February 1973 
 Inactivated 26 June 1992
 Activated on 1 April 1998

Assignments
 82d Fighter Group: 9 February 1942 - 9 September 1945
 82d Fighter Group: 12 April 1947 - 2 October 1949
 4710th Defense Wing: 1 November 1952
 525th Air Defense Group: 8 February 1953
 82d Fighter Wing: 18 August 1955 - 8 January 1958
 82d Flying Training Wing: 1 February 1973 - 26 June 1992
 340th Flying Training Group 1 April 1998 – Present

Stations

 Harding Field, Louisiana, 9 February 1942
 Muroc Army Air Field, California, 30 April 1942
 Glendale, California, 18 May 1942 - 16 September 1942
 RAF Eglinton, Northern Ireland, 5 October 1942
 Tafaraoui Airfield, Algeria, 24 December 1942
 Telergma Airfield, Algeria, 1 January 1943
 Berteaux Airfield, Algeria, 1 April 1943
 Souk-el-Arba Airfield, Tunisia, 13 June 1943
 Grombalia Airfield, Tunisia, 4 August 1943
 (operated from Maddalina, Sicily, Italy 6–18 September 1943)

 San Pancrazio Airfield, Italy, c. 3 October 1943
 Lecce Airfield, Italy, 10 October 1943
 Vincenzo Airfield, Italy, 11 January 1944
 Lesina Airfield, Italy, c. 30 August 1945 – 9 September 1945
 Grenier Air Force Base, New Hampshire, 12 April 1947– 2 October 1949
 (deployed to Ladd Air Force Base, Alaska 4 April-29 June 1948)
 New Castle Air Force Base, Delaware, 1 November 1952 – 8 January 1958
 Williams Air Force Base, Arizona, 1 February 1973– 1 April 1993
 Laughlin Air Force Base, Texas, 1 April 1998 – Present

Aircraft

P-38 Lightning (1942–1945)
F-51 Mustang (1947–1949)
F-94B Starfire (1952–1957)
T-37 Tweet (1973–1992, 1998–2004)

T-38 Talon (1998–Present)
T-1 Jayhawk (1998–Present)
T-6 Texan II (2002–Present)

Awards and Campaigns

See also

References

 Notes

Bibliography

 Buss, Lydus H.(ed), Sturm, Thomas A., Volan, Denys, and McMullen, Richard F., History of Continental Air Defense Command and Air Defense Command July to December 1955, Directorate of Historical Services, Air Defense Command, Ent AFB, CO, 1956
 
 
 
 
 

(January 2012) retrieved November 15, 2013

Further reading
 
 
 
 
 
 USAF Aerospace Defense Command publication, The Interceptor, January 1979 (Volume 21, Number 1).

External links
USAF 96th Flying Training Squadron History

Military units and formations in Texas
0096